Ottery Hundred was the name of one of thirty two ancient administrative units of Devon, England.

The parish of Ottery St Mary was the only parish in this hundred.

See also 
 List of hundreds of England and Wales - Devon

References 

Hundreds of Devon